Poljani may refer to:

Poljani (Kakanj), a village in the municipality of Kakanj, Bosnia and Herzegovina
Poljani, Kreševo, a village in the municipality of Kreševo, Bosnia and Herzegovina
, a village in the municipality of Grubišno Polje, Croatia